The Comoros Super Cup is a Comorian football competition, held as a game between the reigning champions of the Comoros Premier League and the Comoros Cup. The first edition was held in 2011.

Winners

See also
 Comoros Premier League
 Comoros Cup

External links
 Elan Club signe l`histoire de la Super-Coupe - latribunelan

Football competitions in the Comoros
National association football cups